Theme from Doctor Detroit is an EP by American new wave band Devo, released in 1983 by MCA Records. It includes the two songs from the Doctor Detroit movie soundtrack recorded by the band (the title song and "Luv-Luv"), plus a dance mix of the title theme. A music video for the song, containing scenes from the movie as well as footage of the band, was released on the We're All Devo home video in 1984 and also appears on the 2014 re-release of The Complete Truth About De-Evolution video collection.

Availability
The title track and "Luv-Luv" were both issued on the soundtrack album of the movie, while the dance mix of the song was re-released in 2000 on the compilation album, Pioneers Who Got Scalped: The Anthology.

Track listing
All songs written by Mark Mothersbaugh and Gerald Casale

Side one
"Theme from Doctor Detroit (Dance Mix)" – 6:00

Side two
"Luv-Luv" – 3:36
"Theme From Doctor Detroit" – 3:10

Chart performance
In the US, the "Theme from Doctor Detroit" made it to No. 50 on the Billboard Dance/Disco Top 80 chart. On the Hot 100, the song went to No. 59.

Personnel
Devo
 Mark Mothersbaugh – lead vocals; keyboards
 Gerald Casale – lead and background vocals; bass guitar; keyboards
 Bob Casale – guitar; keyboards; backing vocals
 Bob Mothersbaugh – guitar; backing vocals
 Alan Myers – drums

Production
 Devo – producers

References

External links
 

Devo EPs
1983 EPs
MCA Records EPs